Naval Air Base San Pedro, NAS Terminal Island was a US Navy World War II 410-acre airfield on Terminal Island in San Pedro, California part of the City of Los Angeles. Before the Navy took control of the airfield, the airstrip was the civilian Allen Field. Allen Field was built in 1927 by filling with sand the Port of Los Angeles and enlarging Terminal Island. Terminal Island is located between San Pedro Harbor and Long Beach Harbor. Allen Field was serviced by the Pacific Electric and pedestrian ferries. The air terminal has three runways in a triangle shape, two short runways and one 4,200 foot runway. A large seaplane ramp was also built at the terminal. A Naval Air Reserve Training Facility was built next to Allen Field in 1927 and used the runway - ramp. Civilian use ended in 1935 and the site began an air base, later renamed Reeves Field San Pedro, after Rear Admiral Joseph M. Reeves. On on 25 September 1941 Naval Air Base San Pedro became part of Naval Operating Base Terminal Island. In 1942 many Reserve troops were trained at the Naval Air Base. In 1943 the Navy took over operations and the Reserve was moved to Naval Air Base Los Alamitos. The base was renamed Naval Air Station Terminal Island and continued as a training base until the end of the war in 1945.

Along with training troop, the base was used to test new planes that were built in Southern California at the plant of: Lockheed, Douglas Aircraft Company and & Vultee Aircraft. Naval Air Ferry Command unit, part of the Naval Air Transport Service was started to test and deliver these new planes. The base work 24/7 testing and shipping out planes, at about 200 a month.

In 1942, NAB San Pedro, now NAS Terminal Island, was now relegated to the task of equipping and performing flight-tests on a large number of military aircraft produced at the nearby plants of Lockheed, Douglas & Vultee. To facilitate delivery of these aircraft, the U.S. Navy established the Naval Air Ferry Command (NAFC) (VRF-3) in 1943. During the war the base was commander was Captain Kneflar "Socko" McGinnis.

Due to a shortage to service men during the war, stationed at the base was a unit of WAVES (Women Accepted for Volunteer Emergency Service). The 200 strong WAVES served as mechanics, air traffic controllers, radio operators, trainers and air navigators.

After the war the base was closed in 1947 and turned over to the Bureau of Yards and Docks. The nearby Naval Air Base Long Beach continued to use the air field until 1997 at which time the base was abandoned; there is no trace of the base today.

See also
California during World War II
Naval Weapons Station Seal Beach
Naval Base San Pedro
San Pedro Submarine Base

References

California in World War II
Formerly Used Defense Sites in California